Guo Tianqian (born 1 June 1995 in Shijiazhuang) is a Chinese athlete specialising in the shot put. She is the 2011 youth and 2014 junior champion in the event. She won her first major senior medal, a bronze, at the 2014 Asian Games.

Her personal best is 18.08 metres outdoors (Jinan 2014) and 16.96 metres indoors (Nanjing 2013).

Competition record

References

1995 births
Living people
Chinese female shot putters
Athletes (track and field) at the 2014 Asian Games
Asian Games medalists in athletics (track and field)
World Athletics Championships athletes for China
Athletes (track and field) at the 2016 Summer Olympics
Olympic athletes of China
Asian Games bronze medalists for China
Medalists at the 2014 Asian Games
21st-century Chinese women